Blood Bitch is the sixth studio album by Norwegian musician Jenny Hval, released on September 30, 2016 on Sacred Bones Records. Co-produced by Hval and Lasse Marhaug, the album was preceded by the singles, "Female Vampire", "Conceptual Romance" and "Period Piece".

Described as "an investigation of blood", Blood Bitch is a concept album which draws parallels between a fictional time-travelling vampire, named Orlando, and Hval's own experiences touring her previous studio album, Apocalypse, girl (2015). The album's lyrical content is also influenced by menstruation, 1970s horror and exploitation films and Virginia Woolf.

Writing and composition
During the writing process for Blood Bitch, Hval was influenced by vampiric imagery and 1970s horror and exploitation films: “I was amazed about how much taboo they could contain without moral compass, how much incest there could be.” In a statement released upon the album's announcement, she elaborated: "Blood Bitch is a fictitious story, fed by characters and images from horror and exploitation films of the '70s. With that language, rather than smart, modern social commentary, I found I could tell a different story about myself and my own time: a poetic diary of modern transience and transcendence."

Describing the album has her "most fictional and most personal album," Hval noted that its dark lyrical and musical content reconnected her with her goth and metal roots: "It’s also the first album where I’ve started reconnecting with the [sic] scene I started out playing in many years ago, by remembering the drony qualities of Norwegian Black Metal. It’s an album of vampires, lunar cycles, sticky choruses, and the smell of warm leaves and winter."

Orlando, the vampiric character whom much of the album focuses upon, was influenced by the Virginia Woolf novel, Orlando: A Biography. Hval elaborated: "[Woolf's] Orlando is a character that lives through several centuries. He starts out being a male growing up. At some point through history, he changes into a she. So it’s a coming of age story that is very fluid, traveling through time and gender. It’s a really lovely book and I think all of my albums are inspired by it in some way because it’s one of those things I read quite early on. It really influenced the way I think about art. For example: With this album, I didn’t intend to do anything in particular beyond beautiful songs when I started writing it. A horror theme and a vampire theme quickly came into it almost subconsciously. When it was all finished, I realized it was just Orlando."

Hval has also described novelist Chris Kraus as "someone I’ve just read and reread constantly and who’s been a really huge [...] inspiration for me." The track Conceptual Romance's references Kraus' I Love Dick and, like the novel, looks at the intersection of feminism and infatuation.

Recording
Hval co-produced the album with Norwegian noise music musician Lasse Marhaug, who had previously collaborated with Hval on her previous album, Apocalypse, girl. Regarding his initial scepticism over working alongside Hval, he noted: "I come from the noise, underground, contemporary, and improvised music [scenes], and I had no experience making pop music. It didn’t make sense to ask me to produce to a pop album. [But Jenny’s] a very smart person, and she obviously saw something in me that I didn’t realize that I had." On working with Marhaug, Hval noted, "Lasse relates to sound in an abstract way. That’s a better way to look at it than as individual songs because many times you end up with an illusion that can’t be broken. Looking at the album as a whole and then putting holes in it means you have these bits of reality peaking through. I love those moments."

Critical reception

Blood Bitch received widespread acclaim from music critics. At Metacritic, which assigns a normalized rating out of 100 to reviews from mainstream critics, the album received an average score of 84 based on 23 reviews, indicating "universal acclaim".

Writing for AllMusic, Heather Phares praised Hval's dedication to the album's themes, alongside its overall aesthetic and unexpected pop-based songwriting: "a bewitching album from an artist at the peak of her powers."

Accolades

Track listing

Personnel
Jenny Hval – vocals, background vocals, composer, arranger, instruments, production, programming (all tracks), concept
Lasse Marhaug – art direction, composer (tracks 3 & 8), mixing, production (all tracks)
Marcus Schmickler – mastering

References

2016 albums
Concept albums
Jenny Hval albums
Sacred Bones Records albums
Experimental pop albums
Vampires in popular culture